The Lion Cup was a premier domestic rugby union knock-out competition in South Africa.
The first Lion cup was held in 1983 where the Free State took the first title facing Transvaal at Ellis Park. The last season was held in 1994.

Finals results in the Lion Cup

See also
 Rugby union in South Africa
 Vodacom Cup
 Currie Cup / Central Series

References

 
Rugby union competitions for provincial teams
1983 establishments in South Africa
1994 disestablishments in South Africa